Rubén Pegorín (born 28 April 1965) is an Argentine cyclist. He competed in the men's individual road race at the 1996 Summer Olympics.

References

External links
 

1965 births
Living people
Argentine male cyclists
Olympic cyclists of Argentina
Cyclists at the 1996 Summer Olympics
Place of birth missing (living people)